Robert Gabriel Sayine is a former territorial level politician from and former Chief for the Deninu K-ue First Nation from 2001 to 2007 in Northwest Territories, Canada . He previously served as a member of the Northwest Territories Legislature from 1979 until 1983.

Sayine was first elected by acclamation to the Northwest Territories Legislature in the 1979 Northwest Territories general election. He won the electoral district of Great Slave East holding the riding for a single term in office. He did not return after the legislature was dissolved in 1983.

Sayine attempted a political comeback by running for re-election in the electoral district of Tu Nedhe in the 2003 Northwest Territories general election. He was defeated by candidate Bobby J. Villeneuve finishing fourth in a seven-way race with 12% of the popular vote.

He is the current Chief for the Deninu K-ue First Nation, having been elected to that position for the first time in 2001. He was elected to the position of Councilor for the Deninu K-ue First Nation on February 15, 2007.

References

Members of the Legislative Assembly of the Northwest Territories
Living people
Year of birth missing (living people)